Oksana Saprykina (Original name Оксана Саприкіна; born 18 January 1979) is a road cyclist from Ukraine. She represented her nation at the 2000 Summer Olympics.

References

External links
 profile at sports-reference.com

Ukrainian female cyclists
Cyclists at the 2000 Summer Olympics
Olympic cyclists of Ukraine
Living people
Place of birth missing (living people)
1979 births